Brenden Schooler (born May 30, 1997) is an American football safety and special teamer for the New England Patriots of the National Football League (NFL). He was signed as an undrafted free agent by the Patriots in 2022. Schooler played college football at Oregon and Texas, where he was both a safety and wide receiver.

College career 
Schooler played for four years at Oregon, from 2016 to 2019, where he played both safety and wide receiver. In 2020 he briefly transferred to Arizona, but left after the 2020 Pac-12 football season was cancelled due to the COVID–19 pandemic, transferring to Texas, where he played in 2020 and 2021.

Professional career 

At his pro day in Texas, Schooler ran the 40-yard dash in 4.43 seconds and the three-cone drill in 6.71 seconds. After going undrafted, Schooler was signed by the Patriots in May 2022 to a three-year contract, the standard for undrafted rookies, including a $15,000 signing bonus.

Schooler was one of two undrafted rookies to make the 2022 team, extending the Patriots' streak of undrafted free agents making the team to 19 seasons. 

In the Patriots' Week 2 victory over the Pittsburgh Steelers, Schooler recovered a muffed punt by former Patriots All-Pro Gunner Olszewski, after the Steelers had only 10 men on the field for the play. The Patriots scored the winning touchdown on the subsequent drive. Schooler recovered a second muff in the Patriots' Week 6 win over the Cleveland Browns; a viral video showed him trying to present the ball to head coach Bill Belichick during the game. Schooler also recovered a punt blocked by Jonathan Jones in the Patriots' win over the Indianapolis Colts in Week 9.

References

External links
Oregon Ducks bio
Texas Longhorns bio
New England Patriots bio

Living people
1997 births
American football wide receivers
American football defensive backs
Players of American football from California
New England Patriots players
Texas Longhorns football players
Oregon Ducks football players